is a passenger railway station located in the city of Higashimurayama, Tokyo, Japan, operated by the private railway operator Seibu Railway.

Lines
A limited number of through services to the Seibu Shinjuku line during the morning rush hour.

Station layout
The station has a single side platform serving a single bi-directional track, which is elevated above a road.

History
The station opened on January 23, 1930. Station numbering was introduced on all Seibu Railway lines during fiscal 2012, with Musashi-Yamato Station becoming "ST06".

Passenger statistics
In fiscal 2019, the station was the 74th busiest on the Seibu network with an average of 7,389 passengers daily. 

The passenger figures for previous years are as shown below.

Surrounding area
Sayama Prefectural Natural Park (Tokyo)

See also
List of railway stations in Japan

References

External links

Seibu Railway page for Musashi-Yamato Station

Railway stations in Tokyo
Railway stations in Japan opened in 1930
Stations of Seibu Railway
Seibu Tamako Line
Higashimurayama, Tokyo